"Hysteria" (also known as "Hysteria (I Want It Now)" in the United States) is a song by English alternative rock band Muse and is featured on their third studio album, Absolution. It was also released as a single from that album on 1 December 2003 in the United Kingdom, peaking at number 17 in the UK Singles Chart (see 2003 in British music). The song is also well known for its intricate bass line, which was voted the sixth best bass line of all time on MusicRadar. It reached number 9 in the US on the Billboard Modern Rock Tracks chart.

The artwork for the 7" cover was chosen by competition, and the winner was Adam Falkus. The runner-up images are included in the DVD version of the single. The song was performed regularly during the tour in support of Absolution and remains a staple of the band's live show. The song also appears on the Absolution Tour DVD and on both the CD and DVD of HAARP.

Music video
The song's video, starring actor Justin Theroux and directed by Matt Kirby, is based on the hotel-trashing scene from the movie Pink Floyd – The Wall. It takes the form of a short narrative depicting a man (the protagonist) awakening inside of a hotel room and, through non-linear chronological elements, discovering that he both stalked and eventually met with a prostitute with whom he was obsessed (played by Hayley Caradoc-Hodgkins). This encounter, however, ends violently. The video has several interpretations and can be seen to have several ambiguous elements, including the fit of rage which induces the man to trash the hotel room, and several chronologically non-linear sequences describing elements of plot.

An alternate video was also created for the release of the single in the U.S. which features the band playing in front of a green screen; with white blood vessels, a woman's face, red, grey and black circles overlapping, and lightning. This video is also used in the UK before the watershed, as the original video was deemed unsuitable for children.

The director's cut of the video features several women visiting the protagonist in his hotel room as well as the main woman from the original version and is available on the Microcuts fansite.

Track listing
7", CD
"Hysteria" – 3:47
"Eternally Missed" – 6:05
Produced by John Cornfield, Paul Reeve and Muse.
DVD
"Hysteria" (video – Director's Cut)
"Hysteria" (DVD Audio)
"Hysteria" (live on MTV2 Video)
"Artwork Gallery"

Charts

Certifications

References

External links
Official Muse website

Muse (band) songs
2003 singles
Song recordings produced by Rich Costey
2003 songs
East West Records singles
Songs written by Matt Bellamy
Songs written by Dominic Howard
Songs written by Chris Wolstenholme